is an arcade game developed and published by Atlus. Purikura in this case is an abbreviation of "Princess Kurara" of the Power Instinct game series (not to be confused with the Purikura arcade machines by Atlus), who stars in this action shooter. It was released in the arcades in 1996 and received a Sega Saturn port later on in the year. The character designs were by You Shiina

Story
Peace in Miracle World, a kingdom ruled by the Queen Urara, was torn suddenly by the invasion of the “Scrap Empire” a realm of machines.

The Scrap Empire's leader turned all the citizens of Miracle World in animals. Being defenseless, the Queen was kidnapped.
 
Before being kidnapped, the Queen encommended Gray to find her little sisters and take care of the "Miracle Gem" a gem that is vital for the existence of Miracle World.

Gameplay 
The game is an isometric shooting game with two playable characters.

The gem that transforms Kurara, Kirara and Grey and brings them invincibility for a little bit of time.

Characters 
   After completing her training in other world (in Power Instinct), Kurara returns to her homeland just to find that it has been conquered by the machines. Now she is determined to save her realm at any cost. Like in Power Instinct series, Kurara can transform into Super Kurara form and be invincible for a while, this same effect works for Kirara and Grey. 

   Kirara is the most immature of the Apricot sisters. She is not really conscious of the true danger of her mission and sees it as a way to have fun. Like her sister, she also can transform into a grown-up woman. 

   Grey is the leader of the Miracle World's army and Urara's boyfriend. Thanks to the power of the miracle gem he wasn't converted completely into an animal, but instead he was transformed in a half beast-half human being. Unlike Kurara and Kirara, who can transform into grown-up women with the power of the gems, Grey becomes his real form for a while. 

   Ruler of Miracle World and elder sister of Kurara and Kirara, and also Grey's girlfriend. She was kidnapped by Mr.Fargus, the Scrap Empire.

Reception 
The game was divisive, with low scores in some magazines and better scores in others.

The game has been considered by critics at Hobby Consolas as one of the best in the Saturn's library.

See also
Power Instinct
Kurara Hananokoji

References

External links
Hardcore Gaming 101: Power Instinct Includes information about Purikura Daisakusen

1996 video games
Arcade video games
Atlus games
Sega Saturn games
Shooter video games
Platform games
Video games developed in Japan
Video games scored by Kikuko Hataya